Carlos Quintanilla assumed office as the interim 37th President of Bolivia on 23 August 1939, and his mandate ended on 15 April 1940. A general of the senior officer corps, Quintanilla assumed control of the presidency on an interim basis following the suicide of his predecessor, Germán Busch.

Quintanilla formed one cabinet three days after taking office, constituting the 101st national cabinet of Bolivia.

Cabinet Ministers

Composition 
In his short mandate, Carlos Quintanilla only formed one ministerial cabinet. Of the 11 ministers, three (Minister of Government Vicente Leyton, Minister of Education Bernardo Navajas Trigo, and Minister of Health Alfredo Mollinedo) were direct holdovers from the Busch cabinet. In addition, Felipe Manuel Rivera, who had been Minister of Defense under Busch up until his death, was made Minister of Mining and Petrol, a position he had also held during the Busch administration. The new Minister of Defense replacing Rivera was Angel Ayoroa who had also served in the Busch cabinet as Minister of Industry.

On the same day as the establishment of the new cabinet, the Ministry of Propaganda was abolished. Notably, the office of the vice presidency was also abolished through a constitutional amendment on 4 December 1939. This decision came after Busch's vice president Enrique Baldivieso had attempted to claim his constitutional succession to the presidency.

The term of the Quintanilla cabinet ended on 15 April 1940 upon the inauguration of Enrique Peñaranda. Foreign Minister Alberto Ostria Gutiérrez would be the only direct holdover into the Peñaranda administration. Minister of Labor Demetrio Ramos would also remain in the Peñaranda administration but would be switched from Minister of Labor and made Minister of Defense and later Government. Finally, Minister of Public Works Rubén Terrazas would return as Minister of Education in 1942 while Minister of Agriculture Carlos Salinas Aramayo would be appointed Foreign Minister in 1943.

Gallery

Notes

References

Bibliography 

 

Cabinets of Bolivia
Cabinets established in 1939
Cabinets disestablished in 1940
1939 establishments in Bolivia